Robert Merton may refer to:

Robert K. Merton (1910–2003), American sociologist
Robert C. Merton (born 1944), American economist, Nobel Laureate, MIT professor, son of Robert K. Merton